Gelatoporia is a fungal genus in the family Gelatoporiaceae. This is a monotypic genus, containing the single widely distributed species Gelatoporia subvermispora. The genus was circumscribed in 1985 by Finnish mycologist Tuomo Niemelä to contain poroid crust fungi with a monomitic hyphal structure, clamped hyphae, and producing white rot.

References

Gelatoporiaceae
Monotypic Polyporales genera
Taxa described in 1985